The city of Lumpkin is the county seat of Stewart County, Georgia, United States. Per the 2020 census, the population was 891.

History
This area of Georgia was inhabited by succeeding cultures of indigenous Native Americans for thousands of years before European contact. Historical tribes included the Cherokee, Choctaw and Creek, who encountered European Americans as their settlements moved into traditional territory. During the Indian removal of 1830, the United States government forced such tribes to move west of the Mississippi River to Indian Territory, to extinguish their claims and make way for more European-American settlement.

Lumpkin was incorporated by European Americans on March 30, 1829. First named the county seat of Randolph County on December 2, 1830, it became the seat of Stewart County when the latter was split from Randolph three weeks later. The city was named in honor of Wilson Lumpkin, a two-term governor of Georgia and legislator who supported Indian removal.  His namesake county is at the northern end of the state.

The town grew as a commercial center served by stagecoach. Its merchants traded with the planters in the area. This was part of the Black Belt, named for the fertile land in the upland South that supported extensive cotton plantations in the 19th century. In the antebellum years, planters depended on the labor and skills of hundreds of thousands of enslaved African Americans to cultivate and process the cotton for market.

After the war, many freedmen stayed in the area as sharecroppers and tenant farmers, and the economy continued to depend on agriculture. With land erosion and depletion, cotton farming gave way to peanut and pine tree cultivation, and labor needs decreased. The population of the county dropped markedly from the Great Migration of blacks to industrial jobs in the North and Midwest in the early decades of the 20th century, but the town of Lumpkin remained relatively stable. The county is still quite rural.

Lumpkin was the first small town in Georgia to complete a successful historic preservation project to encourage what has become known as heritage tourism. It restored the Bedingfield Inn, built in 1836 and located on the central square. It is listed on the National Register of Historic Places.

On December 5, 1954, a destructive F2 tornado hit the northwest side of town, killing one and injuring 20.

In the 1960s, a group of citizens created a living history complex known as Westville. They relocated 30 historic structures to create a grouping of western Georgia architecture as would have been found in an 1850s working village. Some of the buildings were purchased from the collection of John Word West established in 1928 in Jonesboro, Georgia. The village, staffed by volunteers to give the sense of daily life, has since moved to Columbus, Georgia.

The nearby private Stewart Detention Center houses federal detainees for the U.S. Immigration and Customs Enforcement. The facility is owned and run by CoreCivic. In 2011 Stewart ranked as the largest and busiest such facility in the United States. Stewart County's share of revenue from the federal government, 85 cents per inmate per day, amounted to more than half of the county's entire annual budget. It was removed from the 2020 U.S. Census geography for Lumpkin city hence the decline in population.

Geography
U.S. Route 27 passes west of the city, leading north  to Columbus and south  to Tallahassee, Florida. Georgia State Route 27 also passes through the city, leading southwest  to Georgetown on the Alabama state line and east  to Richland.

Education

Stewart County School District 
The Stewart County School District holds pre-school to grade twelve, and consists of an elementary school, middle school, and high school. The district has 58 full-time teachers and over 704 students.
Stewart County Elementary School
Stewart County Middle School
Stewart County High School

Elected officials
The current mayor of Lumpkin is Jimmy Babb. Charles Gibson, his predecessor, elected in 2010, was the first African-American elected to this office.

Council Members
Kenneth Seay
Flossie Brown
Denise Tinker
Debbie Stone
Kimberly Seldon
Barbara Cullefer

Heads of Staff
 City Administrator: Phillip Hite
 Chief Of Police: Randy Howard
 Chief of Fire Dept.: Steven Jordan
 City Clerk: Marianna Williams
 Asst. City Clerk: Delores Seay

Demographics

2020 census

Note: the US Census treats Hispanic/Latino as an ethnic category. This table excludes Latinos from the racial categories and assigns them to a separate category. Hispanics/Latinos can be of any race.

2000 Census
As of the census of 2000, there were 1,369 people, 552 households, and 367 families residing in the city. The racial makeup of the city was 70.42% African American, 28.85% White, 0.29% Native American, and 0.44% from two or more races. Hispanic or Latino of any race were 0.66% of the population.

There were 552 households, out of which 29.7% had children under the age of 18 living with them, 34.4% were married couples living together, 26.3% had a female householder with no husband present, and 33.5% were non-families. 28.8% of all households were made up of individuals, and 14.3% had someone living alone who was 65 years of age or older. The average household size was 2.48 and the average family size was 3.08.

In the city, the population was spread out, with 27.4% under the age of 18, 7.4% from 18 to 24, 27.4% from 25 to 44, 21.3% from 45 to 64, and 16.5% who were 65 years of age or older. The median age was 36 years. For every 100 females, there were 89.3 males. For every 100 females age 18 and over, there were 77.2 males.

The median income for a household in the city was $22,315, and the median income for a family was $27,321. Males had a median income of $22,422 versus $20,250 for females. The per capita income for the city was $16,146. About 24.2% of families and 26.7% of the population were below the poverty line, including 35.7% of those under age 18 and 18.3% of those age 65 or over.

Notable People 

 Birthplace of Jarvis Jones, Retired NFL Linebacker for the Pittsburgh Steelers.
 Birthplace of John Wellborn Root, American architect and key figure in Chicago School of design
 Birthplace of Dorothy Pitman Hughes, American Feminist and Civil Rights Activist.

References

Further reading

George W. Chamberlin Jr., ed., Letters of Hawthorn: A Collection of Family Letters by Hawthorn S. Chamberlin, 1845-1865, Gadsden, Ala.: Frost and Frost, 1971.
Helen Eliza Terrill and Sara Robertson Dixon, eds., History of Stewart County, Georgia, Columbus, Ga.: Columbus Office Supply Co., 1958.

Cities in Georgia (U.S. state)
Cities in Stewart County, Georgia
County seats in Georgia (U.S. state)
Former county seats in Georgia (U.S. state)